is a city located in the western portion of Shizuoka Prefecture, Japan. ,  the city had an estimated population of 48,484 in 17,916 households, and a population density of 510 persons per km². The city is known for production of green tea. The city's slogan is "Green for the Next Generation".

Geography
Kikugawa is situated on the Makinohara Plateau of east-central Shizuoka. The Kikugawa River flows through the city. The area enjoys a warm maritime climate with hot, humid summers and mild, cool winters, and is subject to frequent fogs.

Surrounding Municipalities
Shizuoka Prefecture
Kakegawa
Omaezaki
Shimada
Makinohara

Demographics
Per Japanese census data, the population of Kikugawa has been relatively steady over the past 30 years.

Climate
The city has a climate characterized by hot and humid summers, and relatively mild winters (Köppen climate classification Cfa).

History
With the establishment of the modern municipalities system of the early Meiji period on April 1, 1889, the area around modern Kikugawa was consolidated into eleven villages within Kitō District, Shizuoka Prefecture from 38 hamlets within former Tōtōmi Province. Kikugawa Station on the Tōkaidō Main Line train between Shizuoka and Hamamatsu opened on April 16, 1889 leading to an influx of population and development. Kitō District merged with neighboring Sano District to form Ogasa District, Shizuoka in 1896. Through the Taishō and Shōwa periods, Kikugawa developed as a center of green tea production and the tea trade. Kikugawa Town was created on January 1, 1954 through the merger of former Horinouchi Town with four surrounding villages.

The modern city of Kikugawa was established on January 17, 2005, from the merger of the former town of Kikugawa, absorbing the town of Ogasa (both from Ogasa District).

Government
Kikugawa has a mayor-council form of government with a directly elected mayor and a unicameral city legislature of 17 members. The city contributes one member to the Shizuoka Prefectural Assembly.

Economy
The economy of Kikugawa is primarily agricultural, with major crops including green tea, lettuce, blueberries, cantelope and aloe. Light industries include agricultural equipment manufacturing and automobile components manufacturing.

Education
Kikugawa has nine public elementary schools and three public junior high schools operated by the city government, and one public high school operated by the Shizuoka Prefectural Board of Education. The city also have one private junior high school and two private high schools. The prefecture also operates a vocational school, the Shizuoka Prefectural Agriculture and Forestry College.

Kikugawa has three international schools:
 Colégio Nippo-Objetivo de Kikugawa (Centro de Ensino Nippo-Brasileiro) - Brazilian primary school
 Centro Educacional Sorriso de Criança - Brazilian primary school
 Escola Brasileira Sol Nascente - Brazilian primary school

Transportation

Railway
 Central Japan Railway Company - Tōkaidō Main Line
 Kikugawa Station

Highway
  Tōmei Expressway Kikugawa Interchange

Local attractions
Kuroda Daikan Yashiki, an Important Cultural Property
Kikugawa fortification ruins, a group of Sengoku-period ruins, National Historic Site

Notable people from Kikugawa
Yū Koyama - manga artist
Kaduya Shinba - politician
Miuna Saito - pop singer

References

External links

 Kikugawa City official website 

Cities in Shizuoka Prefecture
Kikugawa, Shizuoka